Progress is an unincorporated community in Bailey County, in the U.S. state of Texas. According to the Handbook of Texas, the community had a population of 49 in 2000.

History
Progress was once a station on the Pecos and Northern Texas Railway. The community was founded in 1907 and the residents wanted the community to be a production center for fruits and vegetables, but the development did not occur. It had two stores and 100 residents in 1940, which went down to 49 in 1980 through 2000.

Geography
Progress is located on U.S. Highway 84 and U.S. Highway 70 near the Parmer County line in far-northern Bailey County.

Education
Progress is served by the Muleshoe Independent School District.

References

Unincorporated communities in Bailey County, Texas
Unincorporated communities in Texas